Ischiolepta is a genus of flies belonging to the family lesser dung flies.

Species
I. baloghi Papp, 2003
I. barberi Han & Marshall, 1992
I. biuncialis Dong, Yang & Hayashi, 2007
I. crenata (Meigen, 1838)
I. cyrtopyge Buck & Marshall, 2002
I. denticulata (Meigen, 1830)
I. draskovitsae Rohček & Papp, 1984
I. flava (Vanschuytbroeck, 1951)
I. horrida Papp, 1973
I. hyalophora Buck & Marshall, 2002
I. indica Papp, 1993
I. intermedia Han & Kim, 1990
I. ischnocnemis Buck & Marshall, 2002
I. janssensi (Vanschuytbroeck, 1948)
I. lama Han & Marshall, 1992
I. loebli Rohček & Papp, 1984
I. longispina Papp, 1973
I. micropyga (Duda, 1938)
I. minuscula Papp, 1993
I. nitida (Duda, 1920)
I. oedopoda Papp, 1972
I. orientalis (de Meijere, 1908)
I. pansa Han & Kim, 1990
I. peregovitsi Papp, 2003
I. polyankistrion Buck & Marshall, 2002
I. pusilla (Fallén, 1820)
I. scabifer Buck & Marshall, 2002
I. scabra (Spuler, 1924)
I. scabricula (Haliday, 1836)
I. stuarti Han & Kim, 1990
I. vanschuytbroecki Papp, 1978
I. vaporariorum (Haliday, 1836)

References

Sphaeroceridae
Diptera of Africa
Diptera of Europe
Diptera of North America
Brachycera genera